Amy Rose Locane (born December 19, 1971) is an American television and film actress known for her role in John Waters' 1990 musical comedy Cry-Baby. In 1992, Locane portrayed Sandy Harling in the first season of the prime time soap opera Melrose Place. She appeared in the 1992 film School Ties alongside Matt Damon and Brendan Fraser, as the object of their affections.

In September 2020, Locane began serving an eight-year sentence for a fatal DUI car crash that occurred in 2010. She had previously been sentenced to three years in prison, of which she served two and a half, and was re-sentenced due to the leniency of the original sentence.

Early life and career
Locane was born in Trenton, New Jersey, and graduated from Villa Victoria Academy. By age 12, she had performed in more than 60 commercials before being cast as a series regular on the sitcom Spencer (1984).

In 1989, Locane made her big screen debut in the independent teen drama film Lost Angels starring opposite Adam Horovitz. The following year, Locane had a lead role opposite Johnny Depp as Allison Vernon-Williams in John Waters' romantic comedy film Cry-Baby. The film was a commercial failure, but has since become a cult classic. She twice played the girlfriend of Brendan Fraser, in the films School Ties (1992) and Airheads (1994).

In 1992, Locane was a member of the original cast of the Fox prime time soap opera Melrose Place but left the series after only 13 episodes. She played Jessica Lange's daughter in the 1994 drama film Blue Sky. She played the young lover of Dennis Hopper in the 1996 film Carried Away. In 1997, she starred alongside Ben Affleck and Rose McGowan in Going All the Way and with Jared Leto in Prefontaine. In 1998, she starred in the black comedy Bongwater and fantasy horror Bram Stoker's Legend of the Mummy. Locane returned to television starring in the Christmas movie Ebenezer opposite Jack Palance. Her later credits include The Heist (2001) and Secretary (2002).

Personal life
In 2006, Locane became engaged to businessman Mark Bovenizer and subsequently retired from acting in films. She acted occasionally in local community theater near their Hopewell, New Jersey, home and appeared in two eight-minute shorts released in 2009. They have two daughters, born in 2007 and 2009.

DUI car crash and legal issues
On June 27, 2010, at 9:05 pm, Locane-Bovenizer was involved in a fatal motor vehicle collision in Montgomery, New Jersey. The crash killed Seeman's wife, 60-year-old Helene Seeman.
 
Following the crash, testing revealed Locane's blood alcohol level was .23 percent, nearly three times the limit for legal impairment. In December 2010, Locane was indicted for aggravated manslaughter and assault by automobile. On November 27, 2012, a Somerset County jury convicted Locane of vehicular homicide and assault by auto. On February 14, 2013, she was sentenced to three years in prison for the crime, with Montgomery Superior Court Judge Robert B. Reed imposing less than the minimum five-year sentence due to mitigating factors that included consideration of her children's welfare. Locane served her sentence at Edna Mahan Correctional Facility for Women and was released on parole on June 12, 2015. Late in 2015 following Locane's release from prison, her husband filed for divorce and for custody of their two daughters.

On July 22, 2016, a New Jersey appeals court ruled that the three-year sentencing would be re-reviewed due to what the court felt was an inadequate explanation by Reed for leniency. Upon review, Reed stated in September 2016 that he had erred in his decision and that she should serve an additional six months. On January 13, 2017, however, Reed ruled Locane would not have to go back to prison, saying her conduct since her release indicated she was not a threat to society. Speaking later about the crash and victims, Locane said the memory of Helen Seeman will "be forever in her thoughts." In February 2019, Locane was re-sentenced to five years behind bars but remained free on bail pending an appeal.

On July 22, 2020, an appeals court ruled that a different judge incorrectly resentenced Locane in 2019 and sent the case back for another sentencing. The ruling issued also rejected Locane's argument that sentencing her again violates double jeopardy protections since she had already completed her sentence and parole term. James Wronko, Locane's attorney, said he would appeal to the state Supreme Court, a process that could take several months to play out.

On September 17, 2020, Locane was sentenced to eight years in New Jersey state prison after a judge agreed with prosecutors that Locane's initial sentence was too lenient. New Jersey state law requires Locane to serve more than six years before being eligible for parole.

On January 31, 2021, Locane emailed Eric Brenner from prison after appearing on his show Breaking News Los Angeles. Responding to his suggestion that he approach Howard Stern for help; "Howard actually spoke up one morning after Carried Away came out. I didn't hear him, but he was supposedly very supportive of me."

Filmography

Film

Television

References

External links

1971 births
Living people
20th-century American actresses
21st-century American actresses
Actors from Trenton, New Jersey
Actresses from New Jersey
American child actresses
American female criminals
American film actresses
American people convicted of manslaughter
American television actresses
People from Hopewell, New Jersey